

Tatiana Caban

Bethany Cabe

Caber
Caber is one of the Celtic gods of Avalon, a warrior god. Caber is a good friend to Leir and usually accompanies him in battle.

Cable

Danielle Cage

Danielle "Dani" Cage is a fictional character in Marvel Comics. The character was created by Brian Michael Bendis and Michael Gaydos, and first appeared in The Pulse #13 (March 2006). She is the daughter of Luke Cage and Jessica Jones.

Danielle is named after Iron Fist (Danny Rand), Luke's best friend. When Jessica goes into labor, the hospital refuses to deliver the baby, forcing Luke to get help from Doctor Strange. During the Secret Invasion, Danielle is kidnapped by a Skrull posing as Edwin Jarvis, forcing Luke to team up with Norman Osborn to rescue her; Luke retrieves Danielle while Bullseye kills the Skrull. Eventually, Luke and Jessica decide to hire a nanny for Danielle, settling on Squirrel Girl. During the "Hunt for Wolverine" storyline, Luke and Jessica discover that someone has gotten some of Danielle's genetic material to auction off on the black market.

Other versions of Danielle Cage
In an alternate future timeline, the character inherits both of her parents' abilities and uses the title of Captain America. She was mentored by Madame Natasha. She is taken from her timeline to battle Ultron and then a Doombot, and subsequently teams up with the modern day Avengers to battle Moridun who had possessed Wiccan. She returns to the present to aid the U.S.Avengers in capturing her nemesis, the Golden Skull.

Luke Cage

Caiera

Caiera is a fictional character appearing in American comic books published by Marvel Comics. The character was introduced during the "Planet Hulk" storyline. She first appeared in Incredible Hulk (vol. 3) #92 (April 2006), and was created by Greg Pak and Carlo Pagulayan.

Caiera was born on Sakaar to a tribe of Shadow People, the creators of the Old Power. She was raised by the priests to be a shadow warrior. When she was thirteen, her village was attacked by alien "spikes" that caused the other villagers to mutate into monsters. Caiera, the only survivor, was rescued by the Red Prince. When the Red Prince becomes the Red King, Caiera is his loyal lieutenant and the mother of his daughter. When the Hulk arrives on Sakaar and gains public support as a gladiator, she protects the Red King from him. After a failed attempt to ruin his popularity, the Hulk and his Warbound escape. Caiera is sent to kill the Hulk, but they encounter spikes during their battle. The Red King reveals he controls the spikes, devastating her. She turns against the Red King and aids the Hulk in a coup. Hulk becomes the Green King, and he marries Caiera. She becomes pregnant but dies in the warp core explosion which laid waste to much of the planet. The Hulk returned to Earth in World War Hulk. Although Caiera died, she posthumously – through the Old Power – gave birth to two sons, spawned from beneath the surface of the planet: Skaar and Hiro-Kala.

Powers and abilities
Caiera possessed abilities that were derived from the planet itself. She could transform her body into stone and become incredibly resistant and strong, to the extent that she battled the Hulk to a standstill even when his strength and fighting skills had dramatically increased. She was also an expert fighter and tactician.

Other versions of Caiera
An issue of What If? examined what would have happened if Caiera had survived the explosion instead of Hulk. Angered at the loss of her husband, Caiera takes the entirety of her planet's energy into herself, vastly increasing her power. She then goes to Earth to avenge his death. She kills the Illuminati and enslaves Earth.

Caiera in other media
Caiera appears in Planet Hulk, voiced by Lisa Ann Beley. She follows the Red King loyally because he saved her from the Spikes that destroyed her village and her family. However, it later turns out that the Red King was the one who created the Spikes, thus making him responsible for destroying Caiera's village and killing her people. Once the truth is revealed, Caiera angrily severs her loyalty to the Red King and aids the Hulk and the Warbound in defeating him. Caiera then plants a Spike bug on the Red King, leaving him to be killed by his Death Guard robots as revenge. She then goes on to become the Queen Consort to Hulk, who accepts his new role as the new King of Sakaar.

Caiman

Calamity

Caliban

Callisto

Mrs. Campbell
Mrs. Campbell is a fictional character in Marvel Comics. The character, created by Brian Michael Bendis and Michael Gaydos, appeared in Alias #22 (July 2003).

Mrs. Campbell is the mother of Jessica Campbell, who would grow up to become Jessica Jones. While driving to Walt Disney World, Mrs. Campbell got into an argument with her husband, causing them to be distracted and driving into a military convoy that was carrying hazardous chemicals. The car swerved off the road and landed in an embankment, killing everyone except her daughter, Jessica.

Mrs. Campbell in other media
Jessica's mother, named Alisa Jones (née Campbell), appears in Jessica Jones. She is presented as an amalgam of Jessica's actual mother and the woman who adopted her in the comics. In the first season, Alisa is portrayed by Miriam Shor. Her name comes from Alisa Bendis, wife of Brian Michael Bendis, creator of the comic book character Jessica Jones. She appears in a flashback in the episode "AKA WWJD?" where she attempts to stop an argument between Jessica and her brother Philip. They die when the car crashes into a truck filled with chemicals. She shows up in a nightmare convincing Jessica to get to work. Alisa is a series regular in the second season, portrayed by Janet McTeer. She is revealed to have survived the car accident but is horribly disfigured. She and Jessica were treated at IGH, a private clinic specializing in gene editing. While Jessica was saved and discharged after three weeks, Alisa suffered more severe injuries and needed a longer recovery period. Dr. Karl Malus has to declare Alisa legally dead to save her life because of the illegality of the operations. As a result of the intense gene therapy and reconstructive surgery, Alisa gained super strength similar to her daughter's, but she is also mentally unstable and prone to dissociative episodes. She eventually breaks out of the IGH facility and tracks down Jessica.

Calypso

Cammi

Cancer

Candra

Cannonball

Capricorn

Captain

Captain America

Steve Rogers

William Naslund

Jeffrey Mace

Sam Wilson

James Buchanan Barnes

Captain Atlas

Captain Britain

Captain Fate

Captain Hydra
Captain Hydra (Leopold Zola) is a character appearing in Marvel Comics. The character was created by Rick Remender and Roland Boschi, and first appeared in Hail Hydra #1 (July 2015). He is Arnim Zola's genetic-engineered son seen during the 2015 Secret Wars crossover event. Captain Hydra is in a warzone where Hydra has been in power, fighting Nomad and Ellie Rogers.

Captain Hydra in other media
A variation of Captain Hydra appears in Iron Man and Captain America: Heroes United (2014), as the brainwashed form of Steve Rogers.

Captain Marvel

Mar-Vell

Monica Rambeau

Genis-Vell

Phyla-Vell

Khn'nr

Noh-Varr

Carol Danvers

Captain Midlands

Captain Savage

Captain Spider

Captain UK

Captain Ultra

Captain Universe

Captain Wonder

Rosalie Carbone

Rosalie Carbone is a fictional gangster in Marvel Comics. The character, created by Chuck Dixon and John Romita Jr., first appeared in Punisher: War Zone #2 (April 1992).

Rosalie is the daughter of notorious criminal Julius Carbone. She was engaged to be married to the son of one of Julius' partners, but after meeting the Punisher, she falls for him instead. She eventually meets the man she is supposed to marry, but he and Rosalie's father are killed by her uncle Sal, the supervillain Thorn. The Punisher rescues Rosalie but kills Sal. Rosalie forcibly takes over her family's business and sets a hit out on the Punisher. Despite her best efforts, she fails and the Punisher once again spares her.

Rosalie also briefly goes up against Lynn Michaels (Lady Punisher) while trying to retrieve the Punisher's diary, only for the mercenary she hired to blackmail her over the diary revealing her affair with the Punisher. Another Punisher was sent by Microchip to kill her. With Bullseye's help, she manages to escape, killing a rival mobster who was plotting against her, as well as a vigilante accompanying Cruz. She once again made an attempt on the Punisher's life (leaving him with amnesia after an explosion) but was confounded by S.H.I.E.L.D. She attended the crime families' meeting and was outraged that the Geracis were partnering with her sworn enemy the Punisher. An intense fight broke out ending with Rosalie falling off a roof, courtesy of her former high school friend Leslie Geraci.

Rosalie Carbone in other media
Rosalie Carbone is introduced in season two of Luke Cage, played by Annabella Sciorra. Rosalie is first seen in "Can't Front on Me" attending an auction house with Anibal Izqueda, Eric Hong, and Hai-Qing Yang. In the episode "They Reminisce Over Your", Rosalie is among several gangsters that are seeking a slice of the void left by Mariah's arrest as it was mentioned that she was planning to expand into Harlem like her father did when he tried to drive the Stokes out. While some inmates loyal to her do an attempt on Mariah Dillard's life, Rosalie is visited by Luke Cage intimidating her into staying out of Harlem. Luke later goes into business with her and Anibal after Cage inherits control of Harlem's Paradise following Mariah's death.

Rosalie makes a later appearance in season three of Daredevil. In the episode "Revelations", she is one of several criminal figures that Wilson Fisk directs blackmailed FBI agents to round up for a secret parlay. Rosalie is picked up by Ray Nadeem and Benjamin Poindexter at a groundbreaking opening ceremony as Ray tells her to come quietly. She is taken along with four criminal figures John Hammer, Everett Starr, Latimer Zyl, and Sophia Carter to a fancy restaurant in Hell's Kitchen called the Red Fish Blue Restaurant, where they are seated around a circular table for several hours. Rosalie was shown to be on good terms with Zyl. Fisk then shows up and offers the five criminal figures protection from prosecution in exchange for 20% of their profits. When Starr refuses the offer, Dex kills him by lobbing a baton at his forehead. Fisk uses this as an incentive to hike the tax to 25%, which Rosalie and the other crime lords hastily agree to. In the season 3 finale, Rosalie is later seen as one of the many criminal figures and socialites in attendance at Fisk and Vanessa Mariana's wedding. She comments to Fisk about him sitting her next to the prosecutor that tried to send her to prison and stated that she made him hold her purse. When Nadeem's posthumous confession implicating Fisk in the manipulation of the FBI is leaked onto the Internet, Rosalie along with Hammer and Zyl quickly take their leave before Dex attacks the wedding.

Cardiac

Cardinal

Caretaker

John Carik
John Carik was featured as the main supporting character in the mid-1990s series Blade: The Vampire Hunter and was created by Ian Edginton and Douglas H. Wheatley. He was exclusively referred to in the solicitations as "Bible John", and the use of that nickname was established in the first issue. However, that name was rarely used in other issues. He is one of the last of an order of warrior/scholars named the Cathari, who all take vows to combat the evil forces of the supernatural. Carik appeared in all issues of Blade: The Vampire Hunter (July 1994 to April 1995) except Issue #6. The series was cancelled after ten issues leaving John Carik's story unfinished. Carik was attacked by a supernatural being of an undisclosed nature, the encounter giving him precognition. He was shortly thereafter contacted by and joined the Cathari. Carik is covered from head to toe inwards and sigils that he has carved into his flesh which gives him protection from supernatural beings.

Blade: the Vampire Hunter begins with Carik having a vision of the return of Dracula and the resulting destruction of New York City. His vision gives him the knowledge that Blade is the only one who can prevent the events from coming true. To warn Blade, Carik escapes from the Nyman Psychiatric Clinic and seeks him out. Once he finds Blade, Carik gives him a witch compass, a device for seeking out the supernatural.

John Carik in other media
Although he never made an appearance in the Blade films or in Blade: The Series, many of John Carik's character traits are visible in Abraham Whistler's character. He was originally intended to appear in Blade: The Series (portrayed by Marc Singer) but was eventually scrapped.

Luke Carlyle
Luke Carlyle was created by J. Michael Straczynski and John Romita Jr., and first appeared in The Amazing Spider-Man (vol. 2) #43. He is a thief and con man who worked his way up the corporate ladder, eventually rising to a trusted position. When the CEO of the company he worked at discovered Carlyle was a fraud, Carlyle killed him. Lacking the time to act, and with most of the company's assets either gone or unreachable, Carlyle then hired Otto Octavius under the guise of helping to make him a legitimate researcher, and stole his mechanical appendages. He was finally defeated by a combined effort between Octavius and Spider-Man.

Luke Carlyle in other media
Luke Carlyle, under the alias of The Mad Bomber, appears in the Spider-Man 3 video game, voiced by Neil Ross. The Mad Bomber is the only villain to be featured across all platforms, besides the three antagonists of the film itself. His public persona is that of a respectable businessman, who secretly uses his wealth to provide for his gang, the H-Bombers, equipment, and weaponry. As their name suggests, the gang's main goal is to destroy New York using explosives, though their motivation remains unknown and their plans are constantly thwarted by Spider-Man. The game's H-Bombers storyline culminates with an attack on the Daily Bugle, during which it is revealed that Carlyle has a vendetta against J. Jonah Jameson, who published a story that exposed Carlyle's company as environmentally damaging, driving him out of business and leading him to create his gang. After Spider-Man thwarts the H-Bombers' attack and rescues Jameson, Carlyle either escapes (in the next-gen version), or is defeated and arrested (in the PS2, PSP, and Wii versions). The Game Boy Advance version of the game differs drastically from the others. Here, The Mad Bomber doesn't lead the H-Bombers but instead plants several bombs across the city by himself. He is foiled by Spider-Man, who defeats him and hands him over to the police.

Carnage

Carnivore

Bruno Carrelli

Bruno Carrelli is a fictional character appearing in American comic books published by Marvel Comics.

Bruno Carrelli is an intelligent friend of Kamala Khan.

Bruno Carrelli in other media
Bruno Carrelli appears in Ms. Marvel, portrayed by Matt Lintz.

Carrion

Miles Warren clone

Malcolm McBride

William Allen

Sentient virus

Peggy Carter

Sharon Carter

Tyrone Cash

Cat-Man

Three characters have used the name Cat-Man, all as members of the Ani-Men

Towshend Horgan, Sebastian Patane, and an unnamed man.

Catseye

Ned Cecil
Ned Cecil is a fictional character seen in the 2005 Fantastic Four film. He was one of Victor Von Doom's associates at Von Doom Industries. He was killed by a bolt of lightning through his chest after he told Victor to go back to Latveria.

Cell

Centennial
Centennial (Rutherford B. Princeton III) is a fictional superhero in Marvel Comics, notably Alpha Flight. He was created by Scott Lobdell and first appeared in Alpha Flight (vol. 3) #1 (2004).

Rutherford spent some time as a police officer in Canada. During the Prohibition, he was sent to assist law enforcement officers in America. At one point, his girlfriend Amelia Weatherly goes missing and is later assumed dead. Rutherform 'buries' her and moves on with his life.

He later slips into a coma lasting nearly two decades. The Alpha Flight member named Sasquatch recruits a new team of heroes, including Rutherford, who is roused from his coma. Rutherford helps rescue the original Alpha Flight and fight the Japanese team Big Hero Six. Later, they fight the criminal 'Manimator'.

During his last known adventure, he travels back in time. His teammate Nemesis reveals that she is Amelia. Their post-Alpha Flight adventures have not been shown. A vision indicates the two were buried side by side, per the epilogue of Alpha Flight (vol. 3) #12.

Centurious

Centurius

Century

Century is a fictional character, a superhero appearing in American comic books published by Marvel Comics. The character was depicted as a member of the Force Works team in the series of the same name from 1994 to 1996.

Century first appeared in issue #1 of Force Works and was created by Dan Abnett, Andy Lanning, and Tom Tenney.

Century was a genetic creation consisting of the minds of the hundred strongest and most able of the surviving alien Hodomurians. He possessed all their memories and instinctively used the knowledge he needed. Therefore, he was an expert on many topics and a very skilled fighter, especially with his battle-staff, Parallax. His lifespan was apparently fixed at 100 years. He was sometimes seen levitating while in a deep meditative trance. He had a symbiotic rapport with Parallax, an entity which bound the multiple personalities of Century into a unified self.

Since developing amnesia, Century couldn't remember much about his past and often had to search for the right words which led to Century sounding like a thesaurus when he often used three similar words to express himself. Single memories returned when he was confronted with something from his past or he dreamt about it. After losing Parallax for a while, memories of his composite minds loosened and even after Parallax was returned to him he continued to remember bits from the lives of the Hodomur he was composed of.

To defeat the evil Nexus Being named Lore, responsible for the destruction of their world, the Hodomur race created Century, a being composed of the best 100 surviving Hodomur warriors. Possessing all of their memories, he was able to solve situations in many topics. He started a mission to track down Lore, but during inter-dimensional travel, he was enslaved by Broker and brainwashed. Only the urge to find Lore was maintained on his mind. He soon became a "scout" for the evil alien race of the Scatter, which bought him from Broket. Following constantly Century, the Scatter could feast on the leftovers of the worlds destroyed by Lore. Century first encountered the superhero team Force Works when Scarlet Witch's magic brought the alien on Earth-616 following a battle against the Kree. Century knocked out Kalum Lo, then when questioned by Scarlet about his whereabouts, was able to say only his name. A few minutes later Scarlet Witch, Spider-Woman, and U.S.Agent were all captured by the Scatter, that arriving on Earth the following Century, and also caused Wonder Man's apparent death. Iron Man questioned Century about the Scatter's whereabouts but Century knew only the name of their race and their evil goals, causing Stark to leave him behind. He was next to be brought to the Vault but escaped and teleported to Iron Man. Using the teleportation powers of his staff Parallax, Century helped Iron Man to rescue the team from an unknown world ravaged by the Scatter. He helped Force Works defeat these aliens. Getting quarter to the Works, he soon joined the team on a full basis participating in missions to Slorenia, China, Australia, and defeating the menace of the Starstealth once and for at all. During a brief travel to space aboard the ship of Broker, he was captured by the foe and sold to the mysterious Imogen. He was then freed by Azimuth, that was next to reveal the truth on his origins and life, but she was stricken by an energy blast of Imogen and fell comatose. After killing Broker for good, he returned to Earth, rejoining Force Works in time to help them unravel the plot of Kang (Immortus in disguise) that had on his side a corrupted Iron Man and Cybermancer, alternate version of scientist Suzi Endo. After Stark sacrificed himself to prevent Kang's plans, Force Works had to endure a last fight against alternate universe versions of Wonder Man, and Ultron, belonging to Cybermancer's reality. Force Works managed to resolve this situation. Before the team was disbanded, Century expressed the desire to learn more about his new homeworld, Earth. Force Works then responded to an emergency call starting for a final mission whose result remained unknown.

Century is later recruited by Wonder Man (whose ionic energy leaking problem was affecting his judgement) to join his Revengers in a plot to defeat the Avengers. He was easily defeated by the New Avengers. While incarcerated at the Raft, Century and the rest of Wonder Man's followers were interrogated about their motivations for joining the Revengers. Century stated that he sided with Wonder Man out of sense of honor to him and recognition of the cycle of life.

As his name and some of his history indicated, Century was meant to be the best of the 100 beings that made him up.

He was shown to have greater than human strength, agility, and endurance. Additionally, by using Parallax, he was able to teleport through inter-dimensional space. He's also an expert hand-to-hand combatant.

Century in other media
Century appeared in Iron Man, voiced by James Warwick in season one, Jim Cummings in "The Beast Within", and by Tom Kane in the two-part series finale. A scene in the episode "Data In, Chaos Out" gives Century a civilian identity as a man named Woody where he sports shades and a broad-brimmed hat. In "The Beast Within," Century was the one who told Iron Man that the Force Works team is relocating from Stark Industries following Iron Man's team-up with the Mandarin to stop Fin Fang Foom. In the two-part episode "Hands of the Mandarin," Century rejoins Force Works when Mandarin uses the Heart of Darkness crystal to disable all technology. He appeared to knock out Hypnotia when she was using her powers on Iron Man and War Machine.

Cerebra

Cerise

Chaka 

Chaka was created by Chris Claremont and John Byrne, and first appeared in Iron Fist #8 in October 1976.

Within the context of the stories, Chaka (Robert Hao) learns martial arts from his older brother William. He eventually moves to New York and becomes the crime lord of the Chinatown-based criminal gang 'The Golden Tigers' while his brother William became a lawyer. In his battles, he uses electrified nunchakus. He also has the power to control others' minds, which is amplified by a mystic crystal.

Challenger

Chamber

Chameleon

Champion of the Universe

Chance
Chance is the name of two unrelated fictional characters appearing in American comic books published by Marvel Comics.

Chance (Nicholas Powell)

Wealthy former professional gambler Nicholas Powell was looking for more thrill in his life. He decides to become a mercenary criminal-for-hire, incorporating his love of gambling into his work. Anyone who hires him would, instead of directly paying, bet his fee against him actually completing the mission. If Powell (calling himself "Chance") is successful, he receives his fee; if not, he lost the "bet" and owes that amount to his contractors. The thrill of this risk was the only way in which Chance felt the work was truly interesting.

Chance was first hired by the Foreigner to kill a fence named Andre Boullion. Chance wagered his fee at double or nothing that he could kill Spider-Man, but Spider-Man instead defeated him. Chance was then hired by corrupt city official Robert Phalen to kill a murder witness. His initial attempt was thwarted by Daredevil, and his contract was terminated when Phelan died. Chance was hired under pretense by the Life Foundation to steal a secret arms shipment. The Life Foundation captured him instead, and Carlton Drake sought to duplicate his wrist blasters. Chance joined forces with Spider-Man to overcome the Life Foundation. Chance was next hired by Mister Grouper to kill casino owner Raymond Trask but was thwarted by Spider-Man. Trask then hired Chance under the pretense of protecting Trask from an assassination attempt. Instead, Trask unsuccessfully tried to kill him out of revenge.

During the Spider-Island storyline, Chance (alongside Scorcher and White Rabbit) is seen guarding an abandoned lab at Empire State University when Peter Parker and Carlie Cooper arrive. He ends up knocked down by Parker using the moves he learned from Shang-Chi.

Chance later appeared, attempting to kill the rejuvenated Steve Rogers during a press conference, only to be defeated by the current Captain America. While getting arrested, he mentions to Captain America that he was on Pleasant Hill and did not agree with the heroes' actions as a result of the crisis.

Chance (Fallen Angels)

This version of Chance is a 13-year-old South Korean girl who immigrated to America, then ran away from the church which was mistreating her. The mutant criminal Vanisher recruits her as part of his group the Fallen Angels, teenagers who work as thieves. There, she befriended  the extraterrestrial mutant Ariel.

Marlo Chandler

Robin Chapel

Charcoal

Charlie-27

Charon

Chemistro

Curtis Carr

Archibald Morton

Calvin Carr

Lila Cheney
Lila Cheney is a fictional British rock star and mutant who makes appearances as a guest character, usually in the New Mutants and X-Men comics. Created by Chris Claremont and Bob McLeod, she made her debut in The New Mutants Annual #1 (November 1984).

Cheney possesses the power of teleportation, but only for interstellar distances. During one of her tryouts, she discovered an abandoned Dyson sphere, which she uses as a home base for her teleports. While discovering her powers in her childhood, she arrived on the alien planet Aladna, where she became engaged to royal Prince Yan.

As an adult, Cheney used her power to make a living as a thief, at one point intending to sell Earth to an alien race called Vrakanin. Just before she could execute this plan, she met the New Mutants when they visited one of her New York concerts. When the Vrakanin double-crossed her, she gave up her thieving career and formed a romantic relationship with Sam Guthrie, a member of the New Mutants. She retained her powers after M-Day. Eventually, she would return to Aladna to fulfill her marriage pledge, although Prince Yan ultimately chose another woman as his wife. Cheney later became a citizen of the mutant population on Krakoa.

Lila Cheney (Days of Future Past)
During a fight with Warlock's father Magus, Magik accidentally ends up teleporting her whole team, split up, into two alternative future timelines. In one of them, where the Sentinels have destroyed most of Earth's mutants, Cannonball, Mirage and Lila have established a guerilla operation to take mutants to temporary safety in Lila's Dyson sphere.

Zhou Cheng

Cheshire Cat

Chewie

Chewie is a fictional alien in Marvel Comics. The character, created by Brian Reed and Roberto De La Torre, first appeared in Giant-Size Ms. Marvel #1 (April 2006). Her alien origin was invented by Kelly Sue DeConnick and David López for Captain Marvel (vol. 8) #2 (June 2014).

An ordinary-looking cat was caught in between an intense fight between Carol Danvers, then known as Ms. Marvel, and Sir Warren Traveler inside a fiery building. Following this, the cat randomly showed up at Carol's apartment while she was about to give an interview. Carol opted to finally adopt the stray and calls her Chewie because she reminded her of the Star Wars character Chewbacca. Since then, Chewie made sporadic appearances as a comforting companion throughout Carol's career as Ms. Marvel and when she finally took up the mantle of Captain Marvel.

This all changed when Carol took Chewie into space with her and they encountered the Guardians of the Galaxy. Rocket Raccoon immediately identified Chewie as a Flerken, a species of alien that resembles the Earth cat, but in actuality are dangerous alien creatures. Rocket attempted to kill her before she laid eggs, but Carol stopped him as she did not believe Rocket. He ended up being correct, as Chewie laid 117 eggs that all immediately hatched. Carol, Rocket and their friend Tic had to take Chewie and her offspring to a rescue center where Carol planned to drop them off as she could not take care of them all. However, Chewie teleported back to their ship to be with Carol, leaving her offspring behind.

During the "Empyre" storyline, Chewie was instructed by Captain Marvel to keep an eye on her recently discovered half-sister Lauri-Ell. When the Cotati attack Earth, Chewie assists Captain Marvel and Lauri-Ell by eating some of the Cotati.

Chewie in other media
The Marvel Cinematic Universe version of the character, renamed Goose in reference to the Top Gun character Nick "Goose" Bradshaw (Anthony Edwards), appears in the live-action film Captain Marvel (2019). She is portrayed by four different cats: Archie, Reggie, Rizzo and Gonzo. Each one was chosen based on their personalities and for nuzzling, holding, "face" and "jerk" actions. Goose once belonged to Mar-Vell who was posing as an Earth scientist named Wendy Lawson and met Carol Danvers, who she immediately liked. In the 1990s, when the amnesiac Danvers and Nick Fury were investigating Lawson, Goose finds them and begins following them. She accompanies them on their Quinjet to Louisiana where they go to Maria Rambeau and her daughter Monica Rambeau's house so Danvers can remember her past. There, the terrified Skrull Talos identifies Goose as a Flerken. Goose was present when Talos has a parley with Danvers and Fury. Goose accompanies Danvers, Rambeau, Fury, and Talos into space to a spaceship carrying Skrull refugees. While there, Goose reveals her true nature by using her abilities to defeat Kree soldiers and swallowing the Tesseract. Despite being very tame and friendly, she unexpectedly slashes Fury's eye (presumably because she was annoyed by him), explaining his eye patch. Despite this, Fury adopts Goose as his pet and sometime later, she coughs up the Tesseract in his Atlanta office.

Chimera

Mutant version
Chimera is an interdimensional pirate from an unknown Earth who first encountered Wolverine whilst she was gaining information on him and his feral regressive state. She assisted the self-styled heir of Apocalypse, Genesis, with Wolverine's capture when Genesis wanted to brainwash Wolverine to be his first Horseman. They attempted to re-bond the adamantium to Wolverine's skeleton which had been removed by Magneto but the process failed. Wolverine's body violently expelled the metal, killing most of Genesis' followers, the Dark Riders. Dirtnap—one of the only Dark Riders to survive—teamed up with Chimera to get revenge on Wolverine. Chimera encountered Wolverine once again when he and Venom were lured into a trap set by her and Dirtnap. She and Dirtnap were both seemingly killed in an implosion.

The villains survived and attacked the Generation X school in an attempt to kidnap the M twins, but to defend themselves the twins merged back into M and then merged with Emplate, creating the being known as M-Plate. Chimera then captured Synch and fled along with M-Plate. Synch was later rescued by Generation X.

Chimera is next seen in Madripoor killing drug runners. She is approached by the Red Queen to join her Sisterhood of Mutants.

Later in Japan they dig up Kwannon's body and confront Domino who is there on other business. Domino critically injures her but she gets away with the rest of the Sisterhood and Kwannon's body. After the Red Queen heals her, the Sisterhood perform a spell involving Kwannon's body and a captive Betsy Braddock, returning her to her original body. The Sisterhood then attack the X-Men. Chimera, along with Martinique, attacks Northstar, Cyclops and Dazzler. After taking the adult X-Men out, she tries to attack Armor and X-23 only for the girls to be teleported out by Pixie. Pixie goes and fetches the Stepford Cuckoos and Elixir and Chimera attacks the Cuckoo's who respond by savagely beating her.

Spiral then teleports the Sisterhood back to their base where they split up with Chimera going with the Red Queen to Jean Grey's burial site. There she attacks Domino only to be beaten by Colossus. When the Red Queen is defeated, Spiral teleports the Sisterhood away.

Chimera later appears as a member of a group of Marauders that are brainwashed to attack the X-Men.

As part of the "All-New, All-Different Marvel", Chimera appears as a member of the Marauders. She assists Aries, Azimuth, and Coda into pursuing Nightcrawler through the sewers to capture him and make him Mister Sinister's specimen.

Femizons version
Chimera is an unnamed woman who is a member of the Femizons. She is a metamorph who can grow wings, claws, and other parts.

Mythical chimera
The chimera of Greek mythology appeared in Marvel Comics. It is depicted as a fire-breathing monster with the heads of a lion and a goat next to each other, the front legs of a lion, the wings of a dragon, the hindquarters of a goat, and a snake-headed tail, while also possessing the power of speech. Its history of being the offspring of Echidna and being slain by Bellerophon is still mentioned. At some point, the Chimera was restored to life by Hera to guard the caverns underneath New Olympus. It was accompanied in this job by a Cyclops and some Skeleton Warriors. The Chimera encountered the Agents of Atlas. When it didn't see that they were Olympians, Chimera breathed fire at them, sparking a fight between the heroes and the minions of Hera. Gorilla-Man forced the chimera to set its second head ablaze, causing it to flail around until it was knocked unconscious.

Amadeus Cho

Ch'od

Choir
The Choir is a member of the new UK superhero team The Union. It has been published that The Choir represents Wales, however The Choirs powers have no yet been published to the public.

Chondu the Mystic

Andrew Chord

Chronomancer

Chthon

Chthon is a fictional character appearing in American comic books published by Marvel Comics.

Chthon is an evil Elder God who is the writer of the Darkhold and creating the Dark Temple on Mount Wundagore as well being the one responsible who cursed, Scarlet Witch, with chaos magic when she was an infant. Chthon is a powerful threat in the Marvel Universe with powers of both chaos magic and reality warping making him more powerful than beings like Dormammu and Galactus.

Chthon in other media
 Chthon appears in The Super Hero Squad Show, voiced by Mark Hamill.
 Chthon appears Marvel's Midnight Suns, voiced by Darin De Paul.

Chtylok
Chtylok the Che-K'n Kau first appeared in The Sensational Spider-Man #13 (Feb. 1997) Chtylok is a half-chicken, half-cow creature that inhabits an area of the Antarctic, just outside the Savage Land. Millennia ago, the Fall People of the Savage Land worshiped the fearsome beast, until it went into hibernation. The hole in the ozone layer has begun to cause the ice around the Savage Land to melt, which wakes Chtylok from its hibernation. Somehow, it finds its way to the surface of Monster Island, and follows several fleeing monsters to the Florida Keys. There it meets the Hulk, and engages him in battle. Despite his immense size, he is capable of flight. His strength is in the same class as the Hulk, as he was able to fight him for some time.

Cipher

Citizen V

John Watkins

Paulette Brazee

John Watkins Jr.

Helmut Zemo

Dallas Riordan

John Watkins III

Roberto da Costa

Clash

Clash (Clayton Cole) is a fictional supervillain appearing in American comic books published by Marvel Comics. Clash first appeared in The Amazing Spider-Man (vol. 3) #1 (June 2014), and was created by Dan Slott and Ramon Perez. While he had a brief criminal career and was granted a spot on Parker Industries upon his reform, he regressed back to his criminal roots during the Civil War II storyline.

At a young age, Clayton Cole was a smart kid who was home-schooled by his mother. During his youth, he saw Peter Parker's Masked Marvel appearance going up against Crusher Hogan in a wrestling match. Since then, he started working on technology so that he can be like the "Masked Marvel". This led him to being Clash.

In his first time operating as Clash, Cole came into conflict with Spider-Man. He was defeated by Spider-Man and sentenced to juvenile hall.

After being released on parole, Clash was working as henchmen for Owl and other supervillains.

During the "Spider-Verse" storyline, Clash's latest employer was the Kree named Doctor Minerva. When Spider-Man was aided in battle Ms. Marvel and discovered that the latter has taken an Inhuman baby from Doctor Minerva, Clash turned against Doctor Minerva. Upon recognizing him and seeing that he has gone straight, Spider-Man offered Clash a job at Parker Industries which he accepted.

Clayton's work at Parker Industries involved Spider-Man's globetrotting adventures like helping out against Zodiac to the infiltration of Ghost.

During the "Civil War II" storyline, the Inhuman Ulysses Cain had a vision where Cole is Clash again and attacks Spider-Man. Cole later meets Sully back when he used to work for Owl and can't talk long without violating parole. Later on, Clayton's parents are displeased that their son is working as an "office drone" while his father wants Peter to help with their retirement. While showing his latest project for the NYPD to Parker, Clayton is told that he should talk to him if he has any problems. Upon hearing Ulysses' vision of him when he arrives in Peter's office, Clayton resigns from Parker Industries. At Moynihan's Social Club, Clayton tells Sully and another person on how companies like Roxxon Energy Corporation are destroying the planet. Afterwards, Clayton meets Mendel Stromm who makes a reference to how Norman Osborn stole the former's work to be left poor. After providing Clayton with the Tinkerer's number, Mendel gives Clayton a day to consider helping in revenge on Harry Osborn. After calling Tinkerer who makes him an updated Clash suit, Clayton calls up Stromm. In his new suit, Clash arrives at Stromm's apartment where he finds Stromm in the Robot Master appearance and robots. Robot Master then compliments Clash's outfit and claims that Spider-Man won't know what happened. When Clash attacks Robot Master stating that he will look out for himself, Robot Master unleashes his robots on Clash even when Spider-Man arrives. Spider-Man manages to web Robot Master in the air with foam web. When Spider-Man was talking Clash into getting back to the civilized life, Robot Master rises and attacks them. While Clash flies away, Spider-Man defeats Robot Master by ripping the remote control mechanics from within the robot body, deactivating the robot army. When Clayton states that he was trying to protect Parker Industries from Stromm, Spider-Man stated that he caused harm with his technology, caused millions of dollars worth of damages, and violated his parole. Though Parker did talk to Clayton's parole officer where he stated that Clayton acted in self-defense and that Clayton will have to give up on working on sonic technology. Though Clayton doesn't seem to agree with Spider-Man's proposal to discontinue his work on his sonic technology which leads to Ulysses' vision coming true. After battling Spider-Man on the streets, Clash escapes and returns to the Moynihan's Social Club where he decides to be a crime boss.

Clash was seen at the closed Now Forever Nightclub where he discusses with his thugs the plans to take back his inventions that he made for Parker Industries to evade them being sold to pay off some debts. When Clash enters the Baxter Building to take back the Sonic Transducer, Harry sees that something is off and alerts Spider-Man and the Human Torch. Due to a self-charging power source getting stuck in the upward cycle, Clash had to work with Spider-Man and Human Torch to deactivate it. While Spider-Man catches Clash's thugs, he allows Clash to get away.

During the "Go Down Swinging" storyline, Peter later persuades Clash to look over the Osborn family in light of the Red Goblin's threat. At Port Authority of New York and New Jersey, Clash assists Human Torch in protecting the Osborn family from the Red Goblin. Their attacks do nothing against the Red Goblin because the Goblin formula made the Carnage symbiote immune to fire and sound. The Red Goblin then proceeds to defeat Human Torch, Clash, Silk, Miles Morales, and Agent Anti-Venom.

Clash possesses a genius-level intellect. He can also utilize sonic technology to various uses.

Clash in other media
 A teenage version of Clayton Cole appears in the Spider-Man episode "Osborn Academy", voiced by Yuri Lowenthal. He competes with Herman Schultz for a spot in the titular school, with the former presenting his expertise in sonic technology and "clash-tech", but they get into a fight with their respective technologies, forcing Spider-Man to intervene. However, the battle is interrupted by the Jackal, who steals Herman and Clayton's technology. After the two help Spider-Man defeat the Jackal, the former brings them back to the Osborn Academy to face up to their actions. Norman Osborn takes the blame for driving the two boys into what had transpired, and grants Herman a place in the school. 
 Clayton Cole appears in The Amazing Spider-Man 2 video game, voiced by an uncredited voice actor. This version is a street thug and close friend of Herman Schultz. Spider-Man encounters Cole and a group of thugs during his search for Ben Parker's killer. After webbing him to a wall, Spider-Man deduces that Cole is not the man he is looking for and intimidates him until Cole tells him to seek out Schultz for more information.

Clea

Albert Cleary

Cloak

Cloud 9

Coachwhip

Coal Tiger

Cobalt Man
Cobalt Man is an alias used by fictional characters appearing in American comic books published by Marvel Comics.

Ralph Roberts
The original version of the character, Ralph Roberts, was created by writer Roy Thomas and penciller Werner Roth and first appeared in X-Men #31 (April 1967). He has been an antagonist to various superheroes.

An ex-employee of Stark Industries and the older brother of Ted Roberts, Ralph built a weaponized suit armor powered by cobalt radiation. Ralph gave a tour of his lab when Ted and Jean Grey we're dating and showed his Cobalt Man armor. Unfortunately, he gets unstable and destructive before Cyclops, Marvel Girl, the Beast, Iceman and Angel defeat him, after which he realized the Cobalt Man armor is too dangerous to use. However, Roberts is kidnapped in order to built a giant Cobalt Man robot before being rescued by the X-Men.

Cobalt Man next used a bulkier armor to achieve superhuman size due to the radiation that's slowly killing him and attempts to show the dangers of nuclear power by destroying himself and Sydney, Australia, resulting in a confrontation with the Hulk where Cobalt Man seemingly dies safely away from Earth.

Cobalt Man gets forced into service as Egghead's pawn for the Emissaries of Evil, fighting the Hulk once again until the Defenders helped restore his sanity and he seemingly sacrifices himself in a contained nuclear explosion alongside his tormentor. However, Cobalt Man survived and fights the Hulk once again.

Cobalt Man, now with a more streamlined armor, has a confrontation with the Avengers where he is defeated by Iron Man and the Vision, and subsequently impersonated by Tony Stark to infiltrate the Thunderbolts.

After the Raft's massive supervillain escape, Roberts went in hiding in Stamford, Connecticut with other escaped convicts who are located by the New Warriors (as part of a reality-TV show); the ensuing fight results in Nitro's powerful explosion which killed hundreds, apparently including Roberts and most of the New Warriors.

Roberts is among the dead when Hercules travels to the Underworld in Erebus with a chance to return to life by winning at gambling.

After somehow being revived, Cobalt Man fights Deadpool and the Mercs for Money who capture him for the company Umbral Dynamics.

Cobalt Man's various armors had abilities that included flight, superhuman strength, durability, recoil beams, and oxygen tanks for outer space.

Other versions of Cobalt Man
A version of Cobalt Man is built for Tyrannus, but the robot fought and is destroyed by the X-Men.

A Skrull impersonated the original Cobalt Man, but is defeated by Ms. Marvel.

A group of fanatics of Norman Osborn went on a rampage, but are defeated by Robbie Baldwin.

Cobalt Man in other media
A variation of Cobalt Man appears in the Avengers Assemble episode "A Friend in Need". This version is a robot created by Ultron with teleportation abilities. Cobalt Man fights the Avengers, but is defeated by the Vision.

Cobra

Izzy Cohen

Isadore "Izzy" Cohen is a fictional character appearing in American comic books published by Marvel Comics. His first appearance was in Sgt. Fury and the Howling Commandos #1 (May 1963).

Fictional character biography 
Cohen is one of the many allies of Nick Fury who work together in battling the Nazis throughout World War 2. Cohen has had dozens of adventures with the team, such as in Sgt. Fury and the Howling Commandos #32, where he comes under the influence of Nazi brainwashing. He manages to resist the commands to kill his friends and is able to help turn the tables on his brainwasher and complete the interrupted mission to destroy a weapons plant. During his adventures, his sister, unnamed, is briefly seen.

After the war, Cohen goes back to Brooklyn, settles down with his wife and runs his father's mechanic shop. He has two sons and one daughter. He turns the family business into a string of car dealerships, which he eventually passes down to his sons.

Cohen signs up for a tour of duty in the Korean War, where he makes the rank of sergeant.

Cohen's military career continues to the Vietnam war, where he reunites with the Commandos for a special mission. Outside of the war, Cohen still ends up in trouble. In a 1972 reunion he ends up shot and a decade later, he confronts a Life Model Decoy of the Nazi war criminal Baron von Strucker.

When Nick Fury's espionage organization S.H.I.E.L.D. is corrupted by a sentient Life Model Decoy and nearly destroyed from within, Cohen serves with the group until it can get back on its feet.

Over the years Cohen and his friends have dealt with Nick Fury's deaths, mostly correctly guessing it was some sort of ruse or LMD. They were fooled in one instance where the vigilante Punisher, not in his right mind, had slain a Fury LMD.

Powers and abilities 
Cohen is considered a mechanical genius. Though he specializes in automobiles, he has a talent for rigging and fixing all sorts of mechanical devices. As a ranger, he is also trained in explosives. His weaponry tends to consist of grenades and machine guns.

Izzy Cohen in other media 
 Izzy Cohen makes a cameo appearance in the X-Men: The Animated Series series episode "Old Soldiers".
 Izzy Cohen appears in The Incredible Hulk, voiced by Thom Barry. This version is a ruthless S.H.I.E.L.D. agent and member of General Thunderbolt Ross' "Hulkbusters".
 Izzy Cohen appears in a flashback in The Super Hero Squad Show episode "Wrath of the Red Skull".
 Izzy Cohen appears in The Avengers: Earth's Mightiest Heroes episode "Meet Captain America".

Malcolm Colcord

Coldblood

Collective Man

Collector

Rusty Collins

Colonel

Colossus

Comanche

Comet
Comet (Harris Moore) is a fictional character in the Marvel Universe. He first appeared in Nova #21 (September 1978), and was created by Marv Wolfman and John Buscema.

In the late 1950s, radiation from a gaseous entity resembling a tiny comet mutagenically altered him, giving him superhuman flying and electrical powers, which he used as a costumed crimefighter. Decades later, he went to Xandar to aid its people in their war against the Skrulls as one of the Champions of Xandar. After his son Crimebuster died, the Comet chose to remain on Xandar.

The Comet died battling the forces of Nebula.

Comet Man

Commander Kraken

Conan

Condor

Billy Connors

Martha Connors

Conquest

Constrictor

Contemplator

Controller

Jen Cooke

Finn Cooley

Carlie Cooper

Valerie Cooper

Copperhead

Lawrence Chesney

Arthur Reynolds

Davis Lawfers

Copycat
Copycat (Vanessa Geraldine Carlysle) is a fictional character appearing in American comic books published by Marvel Comics. Copycat first appeared in X-Force #19 (February 1993), where the character was retconned to the first appearance of Domino in The New Mutants #98 (February 1991), and was created by Fabian Nicieza and Greg Capullo. The character has been depicted as a former member of X-Force. Copycat is such a powerful and precise metamorph that she can duplicate another being down to the cellular level.

Actress Morena Baccarin portrays a non-mutant Vanessa Carlysle in the 2016 film Deadpool and the 2018 film Deadpool 2.

Fictional character biography
The daughter of Dorothy and the late Burt Carlysle, of New Brunswick, New Jersey, as a young mutant shape-shifter kicked out of her home, Vanessa Carlysle fell into a life of prostitution in Boston where she met and fell in love with a mercenary named Wade Wilson. Carlysle was soon saved from Wilson's vengeful employers by Zoe Culloden, a time-traveling agent of Landau, Luckman, and Lake who had journeyed into the past to prevent Wilson's eventual self-destruction. That night, Wilson broke up with Carlysle after learning he had terminal illness, leaving her heartbroken. Carlysle became a mercenary herself, eventually employed by arms-dealer Tolliver.

Under his orders, Copycat infiltrated X-Force in the shape of Domino while the real Domino was a prisoner. Her mission was to blow up X-Force's headquarters to kill Cable, but she became attached to the team members, fell in love with Cable and didn't go through with her mission. Tolliver sent Deadpool to force her to set the bomb. Deadpool would be put in her place, if she refused. Deadpool revealed Copycat's cover to X-Force, and left them for dead by blowing up the complex without knowing that X-Force had already escaped.

Vanessa briefly hid herself under the false identity (as a twin) of one of her friends; Tina Valentino. Deadpool and his associate, Sluggo, believing they killed her, killed Tina instead. She then moved in with Garrison Kane in San Francisco, until Cable found them. She was subsequently captured by the emotion-manipulating Psycho-Man, who sought Kane's advanced technology, but was rescued from the Microverse by Kane, Cable, Domino and the Microverse's resident heroes, the Microns. Later, she broke up with Kane and came back to live with Deadpool. Deadpool's feelings towards Siryn grew, so she left him after having taken his appearance to attack her, in hopes of souring their potential relationship.

Some time later, Copycat was captured by Weapon X. The treatments of Weapon X destroyed her memory and she forgot her mission. Recruited by Sabretooth, Deadpool received an order to kill her. He tried to warn her, so Weapon X sent Kane to kill the both of them. The fight took them to a local zoo where Deadpool left her in a shapechanged-gorilla form among other gorillas to fight against Kane. When he returned, the other gorillas were dead and Copycat was dying from wounds inflicted by Sabretooth. She died shortly after in Deadpool's arms.

However, Deadpool had poured an amount of his blood into Copycat's wounds, which, unknown to him, healed her. Vanessa then took up the identity of an owner of a chimichanga stand, and later cheated Deadpool out of one of his past marriages.

Copycat is such a powerful and precise metamorph that she can duplicate another being down to the cellular level. Because of this, she is able to replicate superhuman powers, abilities, and even mental imprints so closely that telepaths have trouble identifying her. Copycat simply requires knowledge to duplicate someone's appearance, but needs physical contact to duplicate anything else. She is also capable of turning into animals, finding these forms easier to maintain than human shape. Weapon X modified her powers by accelerating the rate at which she could duplicate others. However, as a side effect of this enhancement, Copycat began to lose her memory and was unable to hold any solid form for long periods of time.

Other versions of Copycat

In the Age of Apocalypse reality, Copycat was a member of the Brotherhood of Chaos, an elite religious group affiliated to the Church of the Madri. She served alongside other members such as Madison Jeffries and Spyne. She was often referred to as Sister Vanessa or Sister Carlysle. Using her shape-shifting powers, Copycat was able to hide incognito amongst the humans who had hoped to flee North America and was able to discover the site of the Sentinel Evacuation while in their midst. Vanessa led the Brotherhood to an emigration site in Maine and there they clashed with the Amazing X-Men. In an attempt to elude the X-Man Quicksilver, Copycat posed as Scarlet Witch, but was forced to revert to her normal self by Dazzler. Both Copycat and Box were able to escape the X-Men and conceal themselves, posing as humans, and escaped to Europe. They were discovered at a checkpoint and provided a distraction for a group of Altered Humans to pass through, but were subsequently hunted down by Weapon X and Jean Grey, with the latter slaying Vanessa in the process.

In the Age of X reality, Copycat infiltrated Cannonball's X-Force when she worked for the Human Coalition. She was unmasked and killed by Husk.

Copycat in other media
 Copycat makes minor non-speaking appearances in X-Men: The Animated Series.
 Copycat makes a minor non-speaking appearance in Wolverine and the X-Men.
 Vanessa Carlysle appears in the live-action film Deadpool, portrayed by Morena Baccarin. Though she sports a telltale streak of white hair and references are made to the "roles" she has played, Vanessa has not demonstrated any mutant powers as of yet that relate to her comic-book counterpart. This is due to writers Rhett Reese and Paul Wernick deciding the reveal would be too confusing, although they have expressed interest in exploring the idea in a future story. She is in a relationship with and got engaged to Wade Wilson, later learning of his cancer. Following his transformation into Deadpool and disfigurement in an attempt to cure his cancer however, he left her without a word. While working at a strip club, Vanessa is abducted by Ajax and Angel Dust to lure out Deadpool. After he rescued her, Vanessa was initially angry with Deadpool for abandoning her, though she reconciled with him upon learning of his plight.
 Vanessa appears in the live-action sequel film Deadpool 2, with Morena Baccarin reprising her role. Vanessa and Wade celebrate their anniversary and discuss starting a family. However, a drug lord he failed to kill earlier kills her. Following this, Vanessa later appears as a vision in the afterlife to tell a devastated Wade that he must protect Russell Collins from Cable. After Deadpool sacrifices himself to save Russell, he and Vanessa are temporarily reunited, but she tells him it is not his time yet and sends him back. In a mid-credits scene, Deadpool uses Cable's time-travel device to avert Vanessa's death.

Anya Corazon

Gil Corazon
Gilberto "Gil" Corazon is a minor character in Marvel Comics. The character, created by Fiona Avery and Mark Brooks, first appeared in Amazing Fantasy (vol. 2) #1 (August 2004). He is Anya Corazon's father of Puerto Rican descent, as well as Sofia Corazon's widower. Gil was an investigative reporter. He would worry about Anya's well-being, meeting Miguel Leger. This would be due to Gil's investigation of local children involving crime lord Jamie Jade, resulting in intimidation attempts where Sofia was killed in a fire to which Gil fled and went to America with Anya in New York. Gil would later discover that his daughter is Araña thanks to Carol Danvers. But when Anya gets wounded, Gil filed a restraining order to keep Anya safe. Gil is also an acquaintance of the Fantastic Four. After accepting his daughter as Spider-Girl, Gil is killed with the Red Hulk framed as the apparent killer, by the Raven Society organization.

Sofia Corazon
Sofia Corazon is a minor character in Marvel Comics. The character, created by Fiona Avery and Mark Brooks, first appeared in Amazing Fantasy (vol. 2) #1 (August 2004). She is Anya Corazon's mother of Mexican descent, as well as Gil Corazon's wife. Sofia was a member of the Spider Society. During Gil's investigation of local children, crime lord Jamie Jade's intimidation attempts resulted in Sofia killed in a fire to which Gil fled and went to America with Anya to New York. Sofia's ghost would inspire her daughter as Araña, dissuading Araña in taking drastic matters, as well as passing Araña's exoskeleton to Nina Smith.

Peter Corbeau

Edwin Cord

Abraham Cornelius

Archie Corrigan

Corruptor

Corsair

Tom Corsi

Fabian Cortez

Cosmo the Spacedog

Cottonmouth

Cornell Cottonmouth

Burchell Clemens

Phil Coulson

Delphine Courtney

Delphine Courtney is a fictional character in the Marvel Universe, an enemy of the super-team Alpha Flight.

Publication history
Delphine Courtney first appeared in Alpha Flight #7 (February 1984), and was created by John Byrne.

The character subsequently appears in Alpha Flight #11–13 (June–August 1984), Alpha Flight #22 (May 1985), and Alpha Flight #25–28 (August–November 1985).

Delphine Courtney appeared as part of the "Omega Flight" entry in The Official Handbook of the Marvel Universe Deluxe Edition #9.

Fictional character biography
Delphine Courtney was a servitor robot, built by the Roxxon Energy Corporation to serve Jerry Jaxon. The robot initially had a fully feminine human appearance, and was referred to as "she" by its creators to the point that Jaxon himself was unaware of "her" true nature. Courtney acted on Jaxon's behalf to recruit several superhumans that were former members of Gamma Flight and Beta Flight (the Canadian government's training teams) that were dismissed after the government closed Department H, the division that oversaw Gamma, Beta, and the primary Alpha Flight team. Jaxon intended to form a personal super-team to revenge on James MacDonald Hudson, founder of Department H and leader of the still-active Alpha Flight as Guardian, and Courtney was able to manipulate the already-disenfranchised recruits into seeking their own revenge on Alpha through an "influencer" device built into its systems. However, Courtney was unable to influence Roger Bochs (inventor of the Box robot) who was still loyal to Hudson and the Flight program, forcing Jaxon to directly involve himself by taking control of Box.

Luring James and Heather Hudson to America with an offer of employment at Roxxon's New York City holdings, Jaxon and Omega Flight executed an ambush of Guardian while Heather was detained by Courtney. When Heather made an attempt to escape and scuffled with Courtney, the robot's flesh-like facial covering was damaged and its true nature revealed. While Omega Flight's goal of revenge was attained with Guardian's apparent death, Courtney was witness to Jaxon's own death due to feedback from Box's destruction, and Omega's remaining members were turned over to the New York City authorities.

Escaping capture, Courtney freed Omega Flight from jail and employed the group in a new plot against Alpha Flight. Having its appearance reconfigured and incorporating facsimiles of Guardian's battle-suit technology into its systems, Courtney infiltrated Alpha Flight posing as Guardian and eventually lured the group into a second encounter with Omega Flight, using Alpha's trust of "Guardian" to ambush. However, Omega Flight's victory was foiled by the Beyonder's arrival, and Courtney and its team were forced to flee.

Their escape was blocked by Madison Jeffries, a former Flight trainee whom Courtney had avoided recruiting, fearing his ability to control machines and his loyalty to James. When Jeffries attacked with a construct created from an automobile, Courtney used one of the future duplicates of Omega Flight member Flashback as a human shield, resulting in its death (and the mental breakdown of the original Flashback, now condemned to violent death in his future). This enraged Jeffries, who used his powers to destroy Courtney, forcing its internal circuitry out of its mouth.

Bochs and Jeffries later salvaged portions of Courtney's second incarnation to construct a new battle-suit functionally identical to James's original, which was used by Heather under the Vindicator identity.

Powers and abilities
Delphine Courtney possessed superhuman strength, and had a high degree of resistance to physical damage. Its sight and hearing were sharper than a human being's. It also possessed a device called an "influencer" that could affect pre-existing psychological conditions in the human mind, allowing Courtney to manipulate individuals with judicious use of the influencer combined with verbal interaction; however, it could not absolutely control human beings, as Roger Bochs' loyalty to James Hudson allowed him to resist its manipulations. Courtney was also able to disguise itself as a human being with a flesh-like outer covering. It could masquerade as either gender by altering its underlying structure, and could even impersonate specific individuals convincingly enough to fool those close to the person imitated. While impersonating James Hudson/Guardian, Courtney also contained technology that could replicate the properties of Guardian's original battle-suits, granting it all of its identity theft victim's super-powers.

Cowgirl

Graydon Creed

Crime Master

Nicholas "Lucky" Lewis Sr.

Nicholas Lewis Jr.

Bennett Brant

Imposter

Inner Demons

Crimson Cavalier

Crimson Commando

Crimson Cowl

Crimson Curse

Crimson Dynamo

Anton Vanko

Boris Turgenov

Alexander Nevsky

Yuri Petrovich

Dmitri Bukharin

Valentin Shatalov

Others

Crippler

Augustine Cross

Augustine Cross is a fictional character in Marvel Comics. The character, created by David Michelinie and John Romita Jr., first appears in Iron Man #145 (April 1981). He is Darren Cross's son and Crossfire's second cousin.

Cross takes over as his family company's CEO after his father's death and attended the 24th annual Conclave of Electronics Engineers and Innovators, rubbing shoulders with various companies' representatives: Stark Industries, S.H.I.E.L.D., Cord Conglomerate and Roxxon. Cross is thought to be connected with the Raiders' attacks, but he's innocent as Edwin Cord was responsible.

Augustine later kidnapped Dr. Erica Sondheim to transplant a new heart into Darren's cryogenically preserved body. Augustine enlisted Crossfire's aid to have Cassie Lang kidnapped, believing the girl's Pym Particle-irradiated heart can sustain Darren's condition. As Ant-Man and Darren fight while Sondheim transplants another heart into Cassie, Augustine arrives to transport Darren to ultimately flee when the Pym Particles now within in his father's body caused to shrink down.

In light of Darren's refusal to invest in Power Broker's Hench App, Augustine hires Machinesmith to hack into Power Broker's database so the Cross family can steal an algorithm to create the Hench App knock-off Lackey. Augustine gets injured during a showdown where Ant-Man and Stinger fight Darren and Crossfire, ending up comatose. Augustine's hospitalization leads to his father's recruitment of Egghead and vengeance as Yellowjacket.

Darren Cross

Crossbones

Crossfire
Crossfire (William Cross) is a fictional character, a supervillain appearing in American comic books published by Marvel Comics.

Crossfire's first appearance was in Marvel Two-in-One #52 (1979) and was created by writer Steven Grant and artist Jim Craig. His next appearance in Hawkeye Vol. 1 #4 (1983) was the first of many encounters with the title character. Crossfire would later face off against Hawkeye in the pages of Captain America #317 (1986), Avengers Spotlight #24-25 (1989), Avengers West Coast Vol. 2 #100 (1993) and Hawkeye & Mockingbird #1-6 (2010). Crossfire has also battled Nick Fury in Nick Fury: Agent of S.H.I.E.L.D. Vol. 3 #40-41 (1992).

The character was one of the central villains in Spider-Man: Breakout #1-5 (2005). Flashback scenes revealed elements of Crossfire's life before his supervillain exploits. He also went on to appear as a central character in the limited series Villains for Hire #1-4 (2011-2012), a supervillain spin-off of Marvel's Heroes for Hire series.

Crossfire has made minor appearances in Agent X #6 (2002), Secret War #3-5 (2004) and Union Jack Vol. 2 #1-2 (2006). He appeared as a member of the Hood's criminal syndicate in New Avengers Vol. 1 #35, 46, 50, 55-57, 60-61, 63-64 (2007–2010), New Avengers Annual #2 (2008), Secret Invasion #6, #8 (2008), Dark Reign: The Hood #1-2, 4-5 (2009), Marvel Zombies 4 #2 (2009), Dark Reign: The Cabal #1 (2009), Captain America: Siege #1 (2010) and New Avengers: Finale #1 (2010).

William Cross was born in Madison, Wisconsin. He later became an interrogation expert for the CIA. Cross was already building his own rogue covert operations when he romanced federal corrections officer Rozalyn Backus with whom he developed ultrasonic brainwashing technology. Backus was unaware of Cross's illicit activities, and they were engaged to be married until Cross stole the technology and disappeared. In his disappearance, he faked his own death and framed Backus for his own murder. Surviving an attempt on his life which cost him his left eye and his left ear, he replaced them with cybernetic implants and became a prosperous high-tech freelance subversive known as "Crossfire".

Plotting to make the growing superhero community exterminate each other via ultrasonic mind control, Crossfire abducted the Thing to test his technology. Moon Knight (Marc Spector) interfered and Crossfire was defeated.

Crossfire secretly rebuilt his operations at Cross Technological Enterprises (CTE) which was founded by his first cousin Darren Cross. When Hawkeye and Mockingbird investigated, Crossfire first tried to eliminate the two using the assassins Bombshell, Oddball and Silencer. When his three assassins failed, Crossfire decided Hawkeye would make an ideal test subject for his super hero mind control plot, because Hawkeye was prominent enough in the super hero community to attract en masse at a funeral and weak enough to be an easy target. However, Hawkeye thwarted Crossfire's brainwashing, captured the criminals and rescued Mockingbird, and married shortly thereafter.

The vengeful Crossfire subsequently stalked the newlyweds to former film star Moira Brandon's estate. The elderly actress was declared an honorary Avenger after helping Hawkeye and Mockingbird recapture the supervillain. A juggling supervillain team freed Crossfire from police custody. But when he proved unable to pay the group, Crossfire is held for ransom until Captain America, Hawkeye and Mockingbird captured the whole gang. Crossfire later escaped and placed a bounty on Hawkeye's arm, hoping to destroy the hero's skills and break the archer's spirit. An army of supervillains (including Brothers Grimm, Mad Dog, Bobcat, Razor Fist, Bullet Biker and the Death-Throws) look to claim the reward, but are defeated by Hawkeye, Mockingbird and Trickshot. With the bounty hunting supervillains captured, Hawkeye pursues Crossfire through the sewers. Crossfire is knocked off an outfall dam's edge and is left clinging on for his life. Hawkeye contemplates letting the foe fall to his doom and ending the feud between them once and for all. The archer ultimately saves Crossfire's life, letting him rot in prison instead.

Crossfire was among the army of technology based supervillains recruited by Lucia Von Bardas to attack Nick Fury and a group of superheroes who were involved in a secret war in Latveria a year earlier. The hired supervillains were revealed to each be a component of a bomb designed to destroy the city. Fury and the heroes were able to foil the plot and arrested the supervillains involved, including Crossfire.

At some point during one of his prison stays, he befriended Vector of the U-Foes whose secret power nullification technology he had hoped to exploit. Recaptured following an encounter with S.H.I.E.L.D., he was imprisoned in the Vault where the long since exonerated Rozalyn Backus was a member of the Vault's Guardsman force. Seemingly aiding and then foiling an escape plot by the U-Foes and Crossfire, Backus turned the criminals against each other, faked her own death, and stole a fortune in cash and goods from the criminals, including Vector's power nullification chamber (which Backus later claimed to have secretly destroyed due to feeling it was too dangerous to preserve). The criminals were later transferred to the new Raft super-prison, and all escaped during Electro's mass breakout, with Crossfire leading a gang of his fellow mind-manipulators: Controller, Corruptor, Mandrill and Mister Fear. Pursuing Backus, the chamber and their grudges against each other, the U-Foes and Crossfire's gang fought a super-powered gang war in New York until Spider-Man, Captain America and Iron Man broke it up. Crossfire and his gang were recaptured (except Corruptor) and Backus surrendered herself to the authorities.

Along with the Death-Throws, Crossfire was hired by R.A.I.D. to take part in a terror plot in London, only to be foiled by Union Jack, Contessa Fontaine, Sabra and the Arabian Knight. Crossfire was knocked from the top of Tower Bridge and fell to the River Thames below. He was believed to have perished when he didn't resurface.

Crossfire is revealed to have survived the fall and is among the supervillains gathered by the Hood looking to take advantage of the superhero community's split caused by the Superhuman Registration Act. Crossfire becomes a member of the Hood's crime syndicate who go on to battle the New Avengers. He is seen battling his old enemy Clint Barton as Ronin.

Crossfire appears is part of the Hood's crime syndicate that come together with the superheroes to battle the Skrull invasion force in New York City. After the Skrull invasion was thwarted, the Hood's criminal army (including Crossfire) fights against the New Avengers laying in wait for Norman Osborn's personal Avengers. Once again, Crossfire is seen battling Ronin and Mockingbird.

Crossfire is later seen conferring with the Hood to discuss the zombie virus. Whereas the Hood wishes to use the virus to gain more power and influence in the world, Crossfire protests, explaining that one of the reasons he was compelled to ally himself with the Hood was that 'world-conquering' schemes would be avoided. Crossfire is quickly put in his place with a single stern gaze from the supervillain kingpin.

Led by the Wrecking Crew and Dr. Jonas Harrow, Crossfire and the rest of the Hood's crime syndicate rebel against their leader and seek out to make their own deal with Osborn. They attack and defeat the New Avengers and subdue the Dark Avengers. Crossfire was part of the Hood's criminal army that took part in the siege of Asgard, an event orchestrated by Osborn. After the battle was over and the heroes had won, Crossfire managed to evade capture and branched out on his own once more.

Hawkeye and Mockingbird thwart Crossfire's illegal arms dealings, much to the supervillain's anger. He is later confronted by Jaime Slade suggesting that they form an alliance. Together, along with Crossfire's new robotic army of Death T.H.R.O.W.S. (Techno Hybrid Remotely Operated Weapons Systems), the villainous pair plot to destroy the lives of the two heroes. Crossfire and the new Phantom Rider are ultimately foiled, but not before Crossfire almost succeeds in killing Hawkeye and Mockingbird, severely wounds Mockingbird's mother, and murders Hamilton Slade. As a result, Crossfire is captured and viciously beaten by Hawkeye. Despite being imprisoned with numerous injuries, Crossfire takes away a small victory in knowing that he has pushed Hawkeye to a breaking point. Hawkeye later discovered that Helmut Zemo was the mysterious "benefactor" behind Crossfire's illegal arms dealings.

The Thunderbolts' leader Luke Cage will never give Crossfire the opportunity to be part of the team, telling this to Hawkeye. Steve Rogers had already recommended that Crossfire should not be considered for the Thunderbolts program due to his technological prowess that could see the supervillain override the nanite system used to control the inmates.

Crossfire was hired as part of Misty Knight's "Villains for Hire" team in a battle against the Purple Man.

Crossfire was later recruited by Max Fury to join the Shadow Council's incarnation of the Masters of Evil. He is later seen in Bagalia being paid off by Nick Fury Jr. to let Taskmaster out of imprisonment at the time when the Secret Avengers raid Bagalia to recruit Taskmaster.

Crossfire was hired by his second cousin Augustine Cross to capture Cassie Lang for Cross Technological Enterprises due to Augustine's belief that Cassie's Pym Particle-irradiated heart could sustain Darren's body.

Crossfire later accompanied Yellowjacket and Egghead into attacking Ant-Man and Stinger.<ref>Astonishing Ant-Man #13</ref>

During the "Search for Tony Stark" arc, Crossfire rejoined Hood's gang and assisted in the attack on Castle Doom.

Crossfire has no superhuman powers, but is a highly trained former CIA operative. He is an expert marksman with proficient unarmed combat skills and extensive espionage training. Crossfire is a master of brainwashing techniques and has been known to develop his own technology to further these skills. With his gifted intellect, Crossfire is an expert in the field of robotics and cybernetics. He also has specialized knowledge of applied ultrasonics. Crossfire created the "undertaker" machine, a brainwashing device which employs ultrasonic waves to stimulate rage in the emotion centers of his victims' brains.

An explosion caused Crossfire to lose his left eye, left ear, and 85% loss of hearing in his right ear. His left eye was replaced with an infrared imaging device which affords him a semblance of sight even in total darkness, while his left ear was replaced by an audio sensor that is far more sensitive than the human ear. The loss of natural hearing in his right ear has resulted in Crossfire being unaffected by his own ultrasonic technology. His costume is made of Kevlar and has special hidden compartments containing various weaponry and devices. Crossfire uses twin handguns and a sniper rifle as his weapons of choice.

Alternate versions of Crossfire
An alternate version of Crossfire appears in the 2000 three issue limited series Avataars: Covenant of the Shield, where the Marvel Universe is re-imagined in a fantasy setting. In this reality, Crossfire is known as Iron Cross and is a member of the Minions of Evil.

Crossfire in other media
 William Cross appears in The Avengers: Earth's Mightiest Heroes episode "To Steal an Ant-Man", voiced by Neil Ross. This version is a former criminal partner of Scott Lang and is served by Big Ben Donovan, Dontrell "Cockroach" Hamilton, Gideon Mace, Ray "Piranha" Jones and Spear.
 Crossfire appears in Lego Marvel Super Heroes 2 via the "Ant Man and the Wasp" DLC pack.
 Crossfire appears in Marvel Avengers Alliance 2.

Crucible

Crule
Crule is a mutant whose first appearance was in X-Force #12. One of the immortal mutants known as Externals, Crule is the meanest and maddest of them all. According to Gideon, during World War II he worked in a concentration camp, happily operating a gas chamber. He is an ancient berserker, dressing like a barbarian and old enough to remember Mithras. Crule was sent by Gideon to attack X-Force after they rescued Sunspot. However, Crule is blasted out of X-Force's ship by Rictor and falls a few thousand feet, which puts him in a body cast. Crule has enhanced senses, strength, speed, agility, reflexes, coordination, balance, and endurance. His body has natural weapons, including hair coiled into whip-like braids, fangs, and gauntlet-covered claws.

Crusader

Arthur Blackwood

Skrull

Crusher

Greek

Caldwell Rozza

Juan Aponte

Crusher Hogan

Joseph "Crusher" Hogan is a wrestler who fought "Masked Marvel", a wrestler who participated in a tournament. He was quickly defeated, and Masked Marvel eventually became Spider-Man.

Alternate versions of Crusher Hogan
A mutant version of Hogan appears in House of M under the name Green Goblin who befriends a young Peter after their wrestling match.

 Crusher Hogan in other media 
In Spider-Man (2002), Peter Parker fights –who is based on Crusher Hogan from the comics–as the "Human Spider" to make money as a wrestler but is defeated in a cage match.
Crusher Hogan appears in The Spectacular Spider-Man episode "Intervention" in a flashback, voiced by Jim Cummings. In it, Hogan is easily defeated by the Spider-Man.

Crystal

Cutthroat
Danny Leighton
Danny Leighton was born in Austin, Texas. He was a member of the Savage Crims, a New York street gang, as a young man. He later became an assassin and was (as his first high-profile job) hired by Amos Jardine to kill Spider-Man, in place of the mad killer Arcade. Cutthroat battled Nightcrawler, who had gotten wind of the plan, and Spider-Man, and they defeated him with some secret assistance from Arcade himself.

Many years later, he defeated Mangler and Deathstrike in a fight to the death to become the Red Skull's new chief operative, replacing Crossbones. He underwent training by the Taskmaster. He tried to persuade Blackwing and Jack O'Lantern to help him free Mother Night from the police. He initiated a brief affair with Mother Night. With the Skeleton Crew, he battled Crossbones and Diamondback. He realized that Diamondback was his sister, Rachel, and revealed his true identity to her.

When Crossbones returned, Cutthroat feared he would be made redundant and so planned to kill Crossbones in his sleep. However, Mother Night alerted Crossbones to the plan, and so Crossbones was waiting for the "ambush" and slit Cutthroat's throat and he was seemingly killed. The Red Skull even inspected the apparent corpse. However, unknown circumstances show that he is alive and was an inmate in the Raft where he escaped with a lot of other convicts. He was later recaptured.

The Hood has hired him as part of his criminal organization to take advantage of the split in the superhero community caused by the Superhuman Registration Act. He helped them fight the New Avengers but was defeated by Doctor Strange.

As part of the Hood's gang, he later joins the fight against the Skrull invading force in New York City. He joins with the Hood's gang in an attack on the New Avengers, who were expecting the Dark Avengers instead.

During the "Search for Tony Stark" arc, Cutthroat rejoined Hood's gang and assisted in the attack on Castle Doom.

When working for the Power Elite, Cutthroat was ordered by Crossbones and Alexa Lukin to finish off a weakened Thunderbolt Ross. Cutthroat continued to use an electrical stick on Ross. This was all part of Ross' plan as it caused him to regain the ability to turn into Red Hulk who defeats Cutthroat.

Hobgoblin's Cutthroat
While regaining his franchises, Roderick Kingsley sold one of Cutthroat's old costumes to an unnamed criminal to become his version of Cutthroat.

Cyber

Doctor Cyclobe

Doctor Cyclobe is a fictional supervillain in the Marvel Comics universe. The character primarily appears as an antagonist of Machine Man or in his capacity as the head of Baintronics security.

The character, created by Tom DeFalco and Mike Hawthorne, first appeared in Machine Man''.

Cyclone

André Gerard

Gregory Stevens

Pierre Fresson

Cyclops

Cypher

Cyttorak

References

Marvel Comics characters: C, List of